Nydia Margarita Velázquez Serrano (born March 28, 1953) is an American politician serving in the United States House of Representatives since 1993. A Democrat from New York, Velázquez chaired the Congressional Hispanic Caucus until January 3, 2011. Velázquez is the first Puerto Rican woman to serve in the United States Congress.

Early life, education and career
Velázquez was born in the town of Limones in the municipality of Yabucoa, Puerto Rico, on March 28, 1953. She grew up in Yabucoa in a small house on the Río Limones. Her father, Benito Velázquez Rodríguez, was a poor worker in the sugarcane fields who became a self-taught political activist and the founder of a local political party. Political conversations at the dinner table focused on workers' rights. Her mother was Carmen Luisa Serrano Medina. She was one of nine siblings. 

Velázquez attended public schools and skipped three grades as a child. She became the first in her family to graduate from high school. She became a student at University of Puerto Rico, Río Piedras at age 16. In 1974, she received a B.A. degree in political science, magna cum laude, and became a teacher. In college, Velázquez supported Puerto Rican independence; by the time she ran for Congress in 1992, Velázquez no longer addressed the issue, saying that it must be left up to the Puerto Rican people.

In 1976, Velázquez received an M.A. degree in political science from New York University. She served as an instructor of political science at the University of Puerto Rico at Humacao from 1976 to 1981. After returning to New York City, Velázquez was an adjunct professor of Puerto Rican studies at Hunter College from 1981 to 1983.

Political career
In 1983, Velázquez was special assistant to Representative Edolphus Towns, a Democrat representing New York's 10th congressional district in Brooklyn.

In 1984, Howard Golden (then the Brooklyn Borough president and chairman of the Brooklyn Democratic Party) named Velázquez to fill a vacant seat on the New York City Council, making her the first Hispanic woman to serve on the council. Velázquez ran for election to the council in 1986, but lost to a challenger.

From May 1986 to July 1989, Velázquez was national director of the Puerto Rico Department of Labor and Human Resources' Migration Division Office. In 1989 the governor of Puerto Rico named her the director of the Department of Puerto Rican Community Affairs in the United States. In this role, according to a 1992 The New York Times profile, "Velazquez solidified her reputation that night as a street-smart and politically savvy woman who understood the value of solidarity and loyalty to other politicians, community leaders and organized labor."

Velázquez pioneered , a program that aims to politically empower Latinos in the United States through voter registration and other projects. The  project spread from New York to Hartford, Connecticut; New Jersey; Chicago; and Boston, helping Hispanic candidates secure electoral wins.

Puerto Rico
Velázquez has been an advocate for human and civil rights of the Puerto Rican people. In the late 1990s and the 2000s, she was a leader in the Vieques movement, which sought to stop the United States military from using the inhabited island as a bomb testing ground. In May 2000, Velázquez was one of nearly 200 people arrested (including fellow Representative Luis Gutiérrez) for refusing to leave the natural habitat the US military wished to continue using as a bombing range. Velázquez was ultimately successful: in May 2003, the Atlantic Fleet Weapons Training Facility on Vieques Island was closed, and in May 2004, the U.S. Navy's last remaining base on Puerto Rico, the Roosevelt Roads Naval Station, was closed.

U.S. House of Representatives

Elections

1992
Velázquez ran for Congress in the 1992 election, seeking a seat in the New York's newly drawn 12th congressional district, which was drawn as a majority-Hispanic district. She won the Democratic primary, defeating nine-term incumbent Stephen J. Solarz and four Hispanic candidates.

2010

Velázquez's 2010 campaign income was $759,359. She came out of this campaign about $7,736 in debt. Her top contributors included Goldman Sachs, the American Bankers Association, the National Roofing Contractors Association and the National Telephone Cooperative Association.

2012

Velázquez, who was redistricted into the 7th congressional district, defeated her challengers to win the Democratic nomination. Her top contributors included Goldman Sachs, the American Bankers Association and the Independent Community Bankers of America.

Tenure

On September 29, 2008, Velázquez voted for the Emergency Economic Stabilization Act of 2008. On November 19, 2008, she was elected by her peers in the Congressional Hispanic Caucus to lead the group in the 111th Congress.

Before removing her name from consideration, she was considered a possible candidate to be appointed to the United States Senate by Governor David Paterson after Senator Hillary Clinton resigned to become secretary of state.

Among Velázquez's firsts are: the first Hispanic woman to serve on the New York City Council; the first Puerto Rican woman to serve in Congress; and the first woman Ranking Democratic Member of the House Small Business Committee in 1998. She became the first woman to chair the United States House Committee on Small Business in January 2007 as well as the first Hispanic woman to chair a House standing committee.

, Velázquez had voted in line with Joe Biden's stated position 100% of the time.

Committee assignments
Committee on Financial Services
Subcommittee on Financial Institutions and Consumer Credit;
Subcommittee on Insurance, Housing and Community Opportunity;
Committee on Small Business (Chair)
Select Subcommittee on the Coronavirus Crisis

Caucus memberships
Congressional Hispanic Caucus  
Congressional Progressive Caucus
Women's Issues Caucus
 Urban Caucus 
House Baltic Caucus
Congressional Arts Caucus 
Congressional Asian Pacific American Caucus
Climate Solutions Caucus
Medicare for All Caucus
Blue Collar Caucus

Velázquez was formerly a member of the Congressional Out of Iraq Caucus.

Personal life
Velázquez, also known as "la luchadora", married Brooklyn-based printer Paul Bader in 2000. It was her second marriage. In November 2002, New York City Comptroller Bill Thompson controversially hired Bader as an administrative manager in the Bureau of Law and Adjudications, joining Joyce Miller, wife of Representative Jerry Nadler, and Chirlane McCray, wife of City Councilman Bill de Blasio. In 2010, Velázquez and Bader were in the process of divorce.

In October 1992, during her first campaign for the House, an unknown person at Saint Clare's Hospital in Manhattan anonymously faxed to the press Velázquez's hospital records pertaining to a suicide attempt in 1991. At a subsequent press conference, Velázquez acknowledged that she had attempted suicide that year while suffering from clinical depression. She said that she underwent counseling and "emerged stronger and more committed to public service." She expressed outrage at the leak of personal health records and asked the Manhattan district attorney and the state attorney general to investigate. Velázquez sued the hospital in 1994, alleging that the hospital had failed to protect her privacy. The lawsuit was settled in 1997.

See also

List of Puerto Ricans
History of women in Puerto Rico
List of Hispanic and Latino Americans in the United States Congress
Women in the United States House of Representatives

References

External links

Congresswoman Nydia Velázquez official U.S. House website
Nydia Velázquez for Congress

|-

|-

|-

|-

|-

|-

1953 births
21st-century American politicians
21st-century American women politicians
American politicians of Puerto Rican descent
Puerto Rican people in New York (state) politics
Democratic Party members of the United States House of Representatives from New York (state)
Female members of the United States House of Representatives
Hispanic and Latino American members of the United States Congress
Hispanic and Latino American women in politics
Hunter College faculty
Living people
New York City Council members
Hispanic and Latino American New York City Council members
New York University alumni
People from Yabucoa, Puerto Rico
University of Puerto Rico alumni
Women New York City Council members